Aram Ramazyan (born December 6, 1978) is a retired amateur boxer from Armenia.

He represented his native country at the 2000 Summer Olympics in Sydney, Australia in the men's bantamweight (54 kg) division. He lost in the first round to Georgia's Theimuraz Khurtsilava. Ramazyan won a bronze medal at the 1997 World Amateur Boxing Championships in Budapest. The next year, Ramazyan won a bronze medal at the 1998 Boxing World Cup. He also won a bronze medal at the 2000 European Amateur Boxing Championships in Tampere.

References

External links
Sports-Reference.com

1978 births
Living people
Sportspeople from Yerevan
Bantamweight boxers
Olympic boxers of Armenia
Boxers at the 2000 Summer Olympics
Armenian male boxers
AIBA World Boxing Championships medalists